Hankovce may refer to:

 Hankovce, Humenné in Humenné District, Slovakia
 Hankovce, Bardejov in Bardejov District, Slovakia